Taggart Twain Ridings (born September 7, 1974) is an American professional golfer who has played on the PGA Tour and the Korn Ferry Tour.

Ridings was born in Oklahoma City, Oklahoma. His father, an Oklahoma club professional, started him in golf. Ridings played at the University of Arkansas, graduating in 1997 with a degree in marketing; he turned professional later that year.

Ridings has played the Korn Ferry Tour and PGA Tour since 2002, earning over three million dollars on the PGA Tour. Although he has never won a PGA Tour event, he finished tied for second at the 2004 Michelin Championship at Las Vegas. During the 2005 PGA Tour season he had his best year – finishing 91st on the money list and earning nearly $900,000.

In July 2021, Ridings captured his first victory in nearly 19 years at the TPC Colorado Championship. He defeated David Skinns and Yu Chun-an in a playoff.

Professional wins (2)

Korn Ferry Tour wins (2)

Korn Ferry Tour playoff record (2–0)

Results in major championships

CUT = missed the half-way cut
Note: Ridings only played in the U.S. Open.

See also
2002 Buy.com Tour graduates
2007 PGA Tour Qualifying School graduates
2010 Nationwide Tour graduates
2012 PGA Tour Qualifying School graduates
2016 Web.com Tour Finals graduates

References

External links

American male golfers
Arkansas Razorbacks men's golfers
PGA Tour golfers
Korn Ferry Tour graduates
Golfers from Oklahoma
Golfers from Texas
Sportspeople from Oklahoma City
People from Keller, Texas
1974 births
Living people